Zurobata is a genus of moths of the family Erebidae. The genus was erected by Francis Walker in 1866.

Taxonomy
The genus has previously been classified in the subfamily Acontiinae of the family Noctuidae.

Species
Zurobata decorata (C. Swinhoe, 1903)
Zurobata fissifascia Hampson, 1896
Zurobata intractata (Walker, 1864)
Zurobata reticulata (Moore, 1882)
Zurobata rorata Walker, 1865 (syn: Zurobata constellata (Snellen, 1880), Zurobata multiguttata (Moore, 1885))
Zurobata vacillans (Walker, 1864) (syn: Zurobata aequalis (Walker, 1864), Zurobata inaequalis (Walker, 1864), Zurobata irrecta (Walker, 1865), Zurobata niviapex (Walker, 1865), Zurobata selenicula (Snellen, 1880))

References

External links

Boletobiinae
Noctuoidea genera